The Thouless energy is a characteristic energy scale of diffusive disordered conductors. It was first introduced by the Scottish-American physicist David J. Thouless when studying Anderson localization,
as a measure of the sensitivity of energy levels to a change in the boundary conditions of the system. Though being a classical quantity, it has been shown to play an important role in the quantum-mechanical treatment of disordered systems.

It is defined by 
, 
where D is the diffusion constant and L the size of the system, and thereby inversely proportional to the diffusion time 
 
through the system.

References

Mesoscopic physics
Condensed matter physics